The Netherlands competed at the 1964 Summer Olympics in Tokyo, Japan. 125 competitors, 105 men and 20 women, took part in 57 events in 12 sports. Simon de Wit, who had represented his country in rowing at the 1936 Summer Olympics, was the Netherlands' Chef de Mission.

Medalists

Gold
 Anton Geesink — Judo, Men's Open Class 
 Bart Zoet, Jan Pieterse, Evert Dolman, and Gerben Karstens — Cycling Road, Men's Team Road Race

Silver
 Anton Geurts and Paul Hoekstra — Canoeing, Men's K2 1,000m Kayak Pairs
 Steven Blaisse, and Ernst Veenemans — Rowing, Men's Coxless Pairs
 Ada Kok — Swimming, Women's 100m Butterfly 
 Corrie Winkel, Klenie Bimolt, Ada Kok, and Erica Terpstra — Swimming, Women's 4 × 100 m Medley Relay

Bronze
 Cor Schuuring, Henk Cornelisse, Gerard Koel, and Jaap Oudkerk — Cycling Road, Men's 4,000m Team Pursuit
 Jan Justus Bos, Erik Hartsuiker and Herman Rouwé — Rowing, Men's Coxed Pairs
 Jan van de Graaff, Robert van de Graaf, Marius Klumperbeek, Lex Mullink and Freek van de Graaff — Rowing, Men's Coxed Fours
 Winnie van Weerdenburg, Erica Terpstra, Pauline van der Wildt, and Toos Beumer — Swimming, Women's 4 × 100 m Freestyle Relay

Athletics

Men's competition
 Eef Kamerbeek
 Kees Koch
 Frans Luitjes

Women's competition
 Joke Bijleveld
 Jannie van Eyck-Vos
 Lia Hinten
 Gerda Kraan  
 Tilly van der Made

Boxing

Canoeing

Cycling

Twelve cyclists represented the Netherlands in 1964.

 Individual road race
 Bart Zoet
 Gerben Karstens
 Harry Steevens
 Jan Pieterse

 Team time trial
 Evert Dolman
 Gerben Karstens
 Jan Pieterse
 Bart Zoet

 Sprint
 Piet van der Touw
 Aad de Graaf

 1000m time trial
 Piet van der Touw

 Tandem
 Aad de Graaf
 Piet van der Touw

 Individual pursuit
 Tiemen Groen

 Team pursuit
 Gerard Koel
 Henk Cornelisse
 Jaap Oudkerk
 Cor Schuuring

Hockey

Judo

Rowing

Sailing

Shooting

One shooter represented the Netherlands in 1964.

50 m rifle, three positions
 Joop van Domselaar

50 m rifle, prone
 Joop van Domselaar

Swimming

Women
Toos Beumer
 Klenie Bimolt
Marianne Heemskerk
Betty Heukels
Ada Kok
Gretta Kok
Adrie Lasterie
Truus Looijs
Erica Terpstra
Ineke Tigelaar
Ria van Velsen
Winnie van Weerdenburg
Bep Weeteling
Pauline van der Wildt
Corrie Winkel

Men
Vinus van Baalen
Johan Bontekoe
Jan Jiskoot
Ron Kroon
Dick Langerhorst
Wieger Mensonides
Henri van Osch
Aad Oudt
Bert Sitters
Hemmie Vriens
Jan Weeteling

Volleyball

Men's Team Competition
 Round Robin
 Lost to United States (0-3)
 Lost to Soviet Union (0-3)
 Defeated Brazil (3-2)
 Lost to Romania (0-3)
 Lost to Bulgaria (2-3)
 Defeated South Korea (3-1)
 Lost to Hungary (3-1)
 Lost to Czechoslovakia (3-1)
 Lost to Japan (2-3) → 8th place
Team Roster
 Frank Constandse
 Jacques Ewalds
 Ron Groenhuyzen
 Johannes van der Hoek
 Jurjaan Koolen
 Jaap Korsloot
 Jan Oosterbaan
 Dinco van der Stoep
 Piet Swieter
 Joop Tinkhof
 Jacques de Vink
 Hans van Wijnen

Water polo

Men's Team Competition
 Preliminary Round (Group C)
 Defeated Brazil (3-2)
 Lost to Yugoslavia (2-7)
 Defeated United States (6-4)
 Semi Final Round (Group C/D)
 Defeated Belgium (7-5)
 Lost to Hungary (5-6)
 Classification Round (5th-8th place)
 Lost to Germany (4-5)
 Lost to Romania (1-6) → 8th place
Team Roster
 Jan Bultman  
 Fred van Dorp  
 Henk Hermsen 
 Ben Kniest 
 Bram Leenards
 Hans Muller
 Wim van Spingelen  
 Nico van der Voet 
 Harry Vriend 
 Wim Vriend 
 Gerrit Wormgoor

References

Nations at the 1964 Summer Olympics
1964
1964